Phi Serpentis (φ Ser, φ Serpentis) is a solitary star in the Serpens Caput portion of the equatorial constellation Serpens. Based upon an annual parallax shift of 13.52 mas as seen from Earth, it is located about 241 light years distant. The star is faintly visible to the naked eye with an apparent visual magnitude of +5.55.

At the estimated age of 3.42 billion years, this is an evolved K-type subgiant star with a stellar classification of K1 IV. It has about 1.19 times the mass of the Sun and around 4.2 times the Sun's radius. The star radiates 41.7 times the solar luminosity from its photosphere at an effective temperature of 4,493 K.

References

K-type subgiants
Serpentis, Phi
Serpens (constellation)
Durchmusterung objects
142980
78132
5940